The Journal of Cross-Cultural Gerontology is a peer-reviewed academic journal publishing articles on the aging process. The journal includes articles covering both Western and non-Western societies, covering disciplines including history, anthropology, sociology, political science, psychology, population studies, and health care and taking both theoretical or applied approaches.

Abstracting and indexing 
The journal is abstracted and indexed in:

External links
 

English-language journals
Gerontology journals
Springer Science+Business Media academic journals
Publications established in 1986
Quarterly journals